Hemiancistrus chlorostictus is a species of catfish in the family Loricariidae. It is native to South America, where it occurs in the Uruguay River basin, including the Passo Fundo River, in Brazil. The species reaches 14.7 cm (5.8 inches) SL.

References 

Ancistrini
Catfish of South America
Fish described in 1999
Fish of Brazil